Sussex was a constituency of the House of Commons of the Parliament of England then of the Parliament of Great Britain from 1707 to 1800 and of the Parliament of the United Kingdom from 1801 to 1832. It was represented by two Knights of the Shire, elected by the bloc vote system.

Under the Reform Act 1832 the constituency was split into two two-member divisions, for Parliamentary purposes, at the 1832 general election. The county was then represented by the East Sussex and West Sussex divisions.

Boundaries
The constituency comprised the whole historic county of Sussex.

Sussex contained nine boroughs: Arundel, Bramber, Chichester, East Grinstead, Horsham, Lewes, Midhurst, New Shoreham and Steyning; and four Cinque Ports: Hastings, Rye, Seaford and Winchelsea. Each of these areas also elected two MPs in their own right and they were not excluded from the county constituency. Owning property within the boroughs or ports could confer a vote at the county election.

Members of Parliament
Two Members

1290–1660

1640–1832

Elections
The county franchise, from 1430, was held by the adult male owners of freehold land valued at 40 shillings or more. Each elector had as many votes as there were seats to be filled. Votes had to be cast by a spoken declaration, in public, at the hustings, which took place in the county town of Chichester. The expense and difficulty of voting at only one location in the county, together with the lack of a secret ballot contributed to the corruption and intimidation of electors, which was widespread in the unreformed British political system.

The expense, to candidates, of contested elections encouraged the leading families of the county to agree on the candidates to be returned unopposed whenever possible. Contested county elections were therefore unusual.

See also
List of former United Kingdom Parliament constituencies
Unreformed House of Commons

References

History of Sussex
Parliamentary constituencies in South East England (historic)
Constituencies of the Parliament of the United Kingdom established in 1290
Constituencies of the Parliament of the United Kingdom disestablished in 1832
Constituencies of the Parliament of the United Kingdom represented by a sitting Prime Minister
Members of Parliament for Sussex